The Quartermaine family is a fictional family from the ABC soap opera, General Hospital. Created and introduced by Douglas Marland, the wealthy and eccentric family has been a continuous staple on General Hospital since their introduction in the 1970s. The Quartermaines were first introduced in 1977, when Stuart Damon originated the role of Alan Quartermaine. His parents and sister were next to be brought on canvas.

Anna Lee originated matriarch Lila Quartermaine, with David Lewis being the first to play her husband Edward. Jane Elliot was cast as sharp-talking Tracy. The family owned business, "ELQ  Industries,"  named for the family's patriarch, Edward Louis Quartermaine, has been the center of several conflicts within the family.

The family is currently represented onscreen by Monica, Ned, Olivia, Drew, Brook Lynn, Michael, Jake, Danny, Scout, Austin, Leo, Wiley, and Amelia

Background
The Quartermaines are notorious for their socialite status as well as their dysfunctional tendencies. Prone to comedic fights, they annually attempt to have a traditional Thanksgiving dinner only for it to be ruined and have to order pizza. At Christmas time, the family has been known for their annual Christmas reading at the Hospital's Pediatric Ward Christmas party, ever since the passing of former Chief of Staff Steve Hardy, until the party remained to be aired. In a 1992 interview, Stuart Damon described the family:

Once an integral part of major storyline arcs, the Quartermaines have seen a diminishing amount of screen time since 2006, and many characters of the family have died on-screen. Soap opera gossip website Daytime Confidential named the family to their list of Top 10 Travesties of 2007, stating: "No. 3: The Systematic Extermination of the Quartermaine family." The website speculated head writer at the time Robert Guza, Jr. was to blame, as they stated as No. 10 on their list of Top 10 Rivalries of 2007: "Guza vs. the Quartermaines and Their Fans: No battle on our list, save Viki vs. Dorian, has been fought for as long or as hard as Guza vs. the Quartermaine family and the fans who support them. The actors who portray(ed) Lila (until she died), Edward, and Alan were all fired at least once before fan outrage and campaigns brought them back in some form. The actors who portray(ed) Ned, Lois, Brook Lynn, AJ, Emily and Justus saw their characters written off or killed."

Family members
Characters currently on the show are noted in bold; family members through marriage are in italics. Only current spouses or those married at the time of their death appear here.

Ancestors
 Percival Quartermaine - Brother of Constance Quartermaine. Sailed from England to America on the ship the Courage to start a shipping company in the 1700s. When the Courage was attacked and sunk by pirates in 1704 Percival managed to make it to shore.
 Constance Quartermaine – Sister of Percival Quartermaine. Engaged to a Spanish nobleman. Presumably died when the Courage sank in 1704.

First generation
 Edgar Quartermaine
 Martha Quartermaine

Second generation
 George Quartermaine - Son of Edgar and Martha.
 Ida Zemlock
 Harold Morgan - Father of Lila and Hal.

Third generation
 Edward Quartermaine - Son of George and Ida.
 Lila Morgan - Daughter of Harold, sister of Hal, Edward's wife.
 Herbert Quartermaine - Edward's first cousin, father of Quentin.
 Unnamed Male - Edward's brother, son of George and Ida.
 Hal Morgan - Brother of Lila, son of Harold.

Fourth generation

 Bradley Ward - Son of Edward and Mary Mae Ward, raised by Dan Ward.
 Isobel Ward - Bradley's widow.
 Alan Quartermaine, Sr. - Son of Edward and Lila.
 Monica Bard - Alan's widow.
 Tracy Quartermaine - Daughter of Edward and Lila.
 Jimmy Lee Holt - Son of Edward and Beatrice LeSeur.
 Charity Gatlin
 Quentin Quartermaine - Son of Herbert.
Betsy Quartermaine
 Alexandria Quartermaine - Edward's niece.

Fifth generation

 Antoinette "Skye" Chandler Quartermaine - Adoptive daughter of Alan, biological daughter of Rae Cummings.
 Alan "A.J." Quartermaine, Jr. - Son of Alan and Monica.
 Jason Morgan - Son of Alan and Susan Moore, adopted by Monica.
 Andrew "Drew" Cain - Son of Alan and Susan Moore, taken at birth by Heather Webber and given to Betsy Frank.
 Emily Quartermaine - Adopted daughter of Alan and Monica; engaged to Nikolas Cassadine at the time of her death.
 Edward "Ned" Quartermaine - Son of Tracy and Larry Ashton.
Olivia Falconeri Quartermaine
 Dillon Quartermaine - Son of Tracy and Paul Hornsby.
 Celia Quartermaine - Quentin's daughter with his first wife.
 Justus Ward - Son of Bradley and Isobel.
 Faith Ward - Daughter of Bradley and Isobel.
 Austin Gatlin-Holt - Son of Jimmy and Charity.

Sixth generation
 Maya Ward - Daughter of Faith.
 Brook Lynn Quartermaine - Daughter of Ned and Lois Cerullo.
 Michael Corinthos III - Son of A.J. and Carly Benson, adopted by Sonny Corinthos.
 Lila Rae Alcazar - Daughter of Skye and Lorenzo Alcazar.
 Jacob "Jake" Webber - Son of Jason and Elizabeth Webber. 
 Daniel "Danny" Morgan - Son of Jason and Sam McCall.
 Emily "Scout" Cain - Daughter of Drew and Sam McCall.
 Oscar Nero - Son of Drew and Kim Nero.

Seventh generation
Wiley Quartermaine-Corinthos - Son of Michael and Nelle Benson.
Amelia Corinthos - Daughter of Michael and Willow Tait

ELQ
ELQ (Edward Louis Quartermaine Industries/Enterprises/International) is a multinational conglomerate headquartered in Port Charles. Owned by the wealthy Quartermaine Family, it is the one of the largest businesses in the region. Since 1978, Edward Quartermaine has been the sole owner. It is a rival company with nearby Chandler Enterprises and Buchanan Enterprises.

Subsidiaries
 Aladdin's Vault — Company which sells server space, acquired in 2002
 Chloe Morgan Designs — Design company owned by Chloe Morgan, and later by Lila Quartermaine
 CoeCoe Cosmetics — Cosmetics company owned and founded by Lucy Coe
 Donely Shipping — Shipping company once owned by Sean Donely
 Jacks Cosmetics — Cosmetics company founded by Jasper Jacks
 L&B Records — Record label founded by Lois Cerullo and Brenda Barrett, seized by Edward Quartermaine in 1996
 Lila's Kids Summer Camp — Youth camp established in honor of benefactor Lila Quartermaine
 Pickle-Eddy — Business founded by Tracy Quartermaine which manufactured relish (formerly part of TAQ)
 Pickle-Lila — Business founded by Lila Quartermaine which manufactured relish
 Port Charles Hotel — Elegant hotel that was purchased by the Quartermaines in 1993 until it was burned down, The Metro Court was built on the site
 The A.J. Quartermaine Memorial Clinic — A clinic offering free health care to the waterfront community. To be managed by Lucas Jones.
 The Brownstones Waterfront Living Complex — A waterfront revitalization project managed by Morgan Corinthos.

Personnel

Former CEOs

Former Employees

Shareholders/Board members

Residence

Quartermaine Mansion (66 Harbor View Road)

Quartermaine Mansion Gatehouse (312 Harbor View Road)

Family tree

Legend

|-
|
|-
|

|-
|style="text-align: left;"|Notes:

Descendants

 Edgar Quartermaine (deceased); married Martha Quartermaine (deceased)
 Unnamed son of Edgar and Martha (deceased); married Unnamed woman (deceased)
 Herbert Quartermaine (d. 1987); Edward's first cousin
 Quentin Quartermaine; Herbert's son; married Betsy Quartermaine
 Celia Quartermaine; Quentin's daughter with his first wife; married Grant Andrews, Jimmy Lee Holt
 George Quartermaine (deceased); son of Edgar and Martha; married Ida Zemlock (deceased)
 Edward Quartermaine (1920–2012); George and Ida's son; married Lila Morgan (1945–83, 1983–2004), Heather Webber (2004)
 Bradley Ward (1943–74); Edward's son with Mary Mae Ward; married Isobel Ward
 Justus Ward (1967–2006); Bradley and Isobel's son
 Faith Ward (1969–); Bradley and Isobel's daughter
 Maya Ward; Faith's daughter; married Ethan Lovett
 Alan Quartermaine (1945–2007); Edward and Lila's son; married Monica Bard (1978–90, 1991–2007), Lucy Coe (1990–91)
 Skye Chandler (1967–); Alan's adopted daughter; married Tom Cudahy (1988), Jonathan Kinder, Ben Davidson (1998–99), Jasper Jacks (2002–03)
 Lila Rae Alcazar (2006–); Skye's daughter with Lorenzo Alcazar
 Alan "A.J." Quartermaine, Jr. (1972–2014); Alan and Monica's son; married Carly Benson (1999–2000), Courtney Matthews (2002–03, 2004–06)
 Michael Corinthos (1992–); A.J. and Carly's son, married Nelle Benson (2018), Willow Tait (2020–21)
 Wiley Quartermaine-Corinthos (2018–); Michael and Nelle's son
 Jason Morgan (1974–); Alan's son with Susan Moore; twin; married Brenda Barrett (2002–03), Courtney Matthews (2003–04), Sam McCall (2011–18)
 Jake Webber (2007–); Jason's son with Elizabeth Webber
 Danny Morgan (2012–); Jason and Sam's son
 Drew Cain (1974–); Alan's son with Susan Moore; twin; married Sam McCall (2018)
 Oscar Nero (2002–19); Drew's son with Kim Nero
  Scout Cain (2017–); Drew and Sam's daughter
 Emily Quartermaine (1984–2007); Alan and Monica's adopted daughter; married Zander Smith (2003–04), Nikolas Cassadine (2004–05)
 Tracy Quartermaine (1947–); Edward and Lila's daughter; married Larry Ashton, Mitch Williams (1979–80), Paul Hornsby (1991–93), Gino Soleito (1999–2000), Luke Spencer (2005–10, 2010–11, 2014), Anthony Zacchara (2012)
 Ned Quartermaine (1965–); Tracy and Larry's son; married Dawn Winthrop (1999), Jenny Eckert (1992–93), Lois Cerullo (1994, 1995–97), Chloe Morgan (2000), Olivia Falconeri (2017–)
 Brook Lynn Ashton (1986–); Ned and Lois' daughter
 Dillon Quartermaine (1987–); Tracy and Paul's son; married Georgie Jones (2006)
 Jimmy Lee Holt (deceased); Edward's son with Beatrice LeSeur; married Celia Quartermaine (1985–86), Charity Gatlin (1986–2021)
 Austin Gatlin-Holt; Jimmy and Charity's son
 Unnamed son of George and Ida (deceased); married Unnamed woman (deceased)
 Alexandria Quartermaine (d. 1981)

Ward
 According to Mary Mae, she has seven grandchildren; two of them are from Bradley.
 Keesha may have more than one brother, however, only Roy has appeared.
 The remaining grandchildren are Idios's children with her husband who have never been mentioned.

References

External link
Daytime Confidential's Complete Quartermaine History

General Hospital characters
General Hospital families